Mika Sankala (born 16 November 1964) is a Finnish football manager and a former footballer. He is currently the assistant coach for Finland women's national football team.

He played three seasons in the Finnish premier league Mestaruussarja for Sepsi-78 and PPT Pori and three seasons in Swedish Allsvenskan for GIF Sundsvall. Sankala has coached GIF Sundsvall in Allsvenskan and Superettan and Umeå IK in women's Damallsvenskan. January 2013 he joined the coaching staff of Finland women's national team.

References 

1964 births
Finnish footballers
Finnish football managers
Swedish football managers
Finnish expatriate footballers
Expatriate footballers in Sweden
Expatriate football managers in Sweden
Mestaruussarja players
Allsvenskan players
FC Jazz players
GIF Sundsvall players
People from Kemi
Living people
Association football midfielders
Sportspeople from Lapland (Finland)